Oladipo Olamide Emmanuel (born 13 September 1993), known professionally as Chinko Ekun, is a Nigerian rapper and songwriter. He is a graduate of Law from the Obafemi Awolowo University.

Early life
Chinko Ekun was born in Ikeja, Lagos State, Nigeria, into a family of three, where he is the second child. He is a native of Ikare, Ondo State, Nigeria.

Education 
Chinko Ekun attended Blessing Nursery and Primary School, Oshodi, Lagos State and Remade Nursery and Primary School, Igando, Lagos State. He attended Baptist Model High School, Ijegun, Lagos State for his secondary education. He graduated with a degree in law from Obafemi Awolowo University. He did his National Youth Service Corps in Lagos State.

Career

2011–2014: Career beginnings
At the age of 7, Chinko Ekun started developing passion for music. During his first year in the university, he picked interest in commercial and rap music. Chinko Ekun officially started his musical career in 2011, posting videos of his freestyles on Instagram. In 2013, he released "Ekun" as his first official track. In 2014, Chinko Ekun featured in Olamide's Street OT music album, on tracks "100 To Million", "Bang" and "Usian Bolt". He appeared on Olamide Live In Concert (OLIC) 2014, where he did freestyle performance. Chinko Ekun sings in English, Pidgin and Yoruba, focusing solely on hip hop music. His name "Chinko Ekun" was coined from two words "Chinko" and "Ekun". "Chinko", because he was told that he looked like a Chinese during his time in the university and "Ekun", because it is his first official track.

2015–present: YBNL Nation and Dek-Niyor Entertainment
In 2015, Chinko Ekun joined Olamide's YBNL Nation. He released his first official singles titled "Alejo Oran" and "Emi Na Re" through YBNL Nation on 25 February 2015. Barely a year later, he exited the record label after his contract expired, alongside fellow label mates Adekunle Gold and Viktoh. In 2017, he joined Dek-Niyor Entertainment, a Dubai based record label.

On 13 September 2018, he released a song titled "Able God" featuring Zlatan and Lil Kesh. The song earned him his first Headies award as "Best Street Hop Artiste" at The Headies 2019. The song received the nomination of "Popular Song of the Year" at the 2019 City People Music Awards. It won "Street Song of the Year" at the 2019 City People Music Awards.

Personal life
Chinko Ekun is single and revealed he is not ready for marriage yet.

Discography

Awards and nominations

References

1993 births
21st-century Nigerian male singers
Living people
Yoruba musicians
The Headies winners
Nigerian male rappers
Obafemi Awolowo University alumni
People from Lagos State
Yoruba-language singers
English-language singers from Nigeria